The Committee P, or the Permanent Oversight Committee on the Police Services, exercises external oversight over the Belgian police and all civil servants with police authority. It is responsible to the Belgian Chamber of Representatives, the lower house of the Belgian Federal Parliament, which appoints and dismisses its members.

Presidents
The president of the Committee P must be a magistrate.
January 2012 (ad interim since November 2011) Yves Keppens
2008-2012 Bart Van Lijsebeth (2008 ad interim), 2009 definitely) 
? -2008 André Vandoren, who left to become the first director of the new antiterrorist centralized office OCAM.

References

External links
 Official site

Government of Belgium
Joint committees of the Belgian Federal Parliament
Law enforcement in Belgium
Police oversight organizations